ForkLift is a dual-pane file manager and file transfer client for macOS, developed by BinaryNights.

Major releases 
 ForkLift 1.0 was released on June 1, 2007.
 ForkLift 2.0 was released on November 22, 2010.
 ForkLift 3.0 was released on February 21, 2017.

See also 
File manager
Comparison of file managers
Comparison of FTP client software

References

Further reading
 Adam Pash, LifeHacker Replace Finder with ForkLift May 16, 2007
 Clint Ecker, Ars Technica Ars at WWDC: Video interview with Andy and Mudi of BinaryNights July 8, 2007
 Brett Terpstra, Engadget ForkLift 2, slick file management, fast file transfers November 25, 2010
 David Chartier, Macworld ForkLift 2.0 FTP client gets faster, more powerful December 7, 2010

External links
Official website
Official blog

File managers
Orthodox file managers
FTP clients
SSH File Transfer Protocol clients
Utilities for macOS
MacOS-only software